Megarynchus is a genus of bird in the family Tyrannidae (the tyrant flycatchers). It is currently considered to be a monotypic genus.

Taxonomy and systematics

Extant species
 Boat-billed flycatcher (Megarynchus pitangua)

Former species
Formerly, some authorities also considered the following species (or subspecies) as species within the genus Megarynchus:
 Samoan flycatcher (as Platyrhynchus albiventris)

References 

Tyrannidae
Monotypic bird genera